Jack Sullivan (born March 5, 1893, in San Francisco, California, United States, died February 19, 1946) was an assistant director.

He won the Best Assistant Director award at the 9th Academy Awards for The Charge of the Light Brigade.
    
Sullivan is the great uncle of Beth Sullivan, creator and executive producer of the TV series Dr. Quinn, Medicine Woman.

References

External links

1946 deaths
1893 births
Best Assistant Director Academy Award winners
American film directors